Huntsburg is an unincorporated community in Huntsburg Township, Geauga County, in the U.S. state of Ohio.

History
A post office called Huntsburgh was established in 1823, and the name was changed to Huntsburg in 1893. Huntsburg was named after Eben Hunt, the original owner of the town site.

References

Private/Independent Schools 
Hershey Montessori School is an independent Montessori school located on 97 acres in Huntsburg Township. It serves students from seventh through twelfth grade and offers boarding options to students from around the world. It also serves students two months old through sixth grade at its early education campus located in nearby Concord Township, Ohio.

Unincorporated communities in Geauga County, Ohio
Unincorporated communities in Ohio